Thomas Vivian Fiall Jr. (June 20, 1894 – June 21, 1978) was an American Negro league outfielder between 1918 and 1925.

Early life and career
A native of Charleston, South Carolina, Fiall was the older brother of fellow-Negro leaguer George Fiall. He made his Negro leagues debut in 1918 for the Hilldale Club and the Brooklyn Royal Giants. Fiall went on to play four more seasons for Brooklyn through 1923. He finished his career in 1925 splitting time between the Lincoln Giants and Baltimore Black Sox. Fiall died in Wilmington, North Carolina in 1978 at age 84.

References

Further reading
 Defender staff (July 25, 1925). "Tom Fiall Ends 'Pro' Career With Homer". The Chicago Defender. p. 8

External links
 and Baseball-Reference Black Baseball stats and Seamheads

1894 births
1978 deaths
Baltimore Black Sox players
Brooklyn Royal Giants players
Hilldale Club players
Lincoln Giants players
Baseball outfielders
Baseball players from South Carolina
Sportspeople from Charleston, South Carolina
20th-century African-American sportspeople